, son of regent Kanetaka, was a kugyō or Japanese court noble of the Edo period (1603–1868). His given name was initially. He held a regent position kampaku from 1608 to 1612 and from 1619 to 1623. He married Toyotomi Sadako (1592–1658), a daughter of Toyotomi Hidekatsu and Oeyo and adopted daughter of shōgun Tokugawa Hidetada. The couple had, among other children, sons Nijō Yasumichi, Kujō Michifusa, Matsudono Michimoto (1615-1646).

Family
Father: Kujō Kanetaka
Mother: Takakura Hiroko
Wife: Toyotomi Sadako (1592–1658), daughter of Toyotomi Hidekatsu and Oeyo
Children (all by Toyotomi Sadako):
 Nijō Yasumichi
 Kujō Michifusa
 Matsudono Michimoto (1615-1646)
 daughter married Sennyo
 daughter (1613-1632) married Ryōnyo
 daughter (1625-1664)
 son (1622-1664)

References
 

1586 births
1665 deaths
Fujiwara clan
Kujō family